Jol Khvor (also Romanized as Jol Khowr; also known as Chaulak, Chavlak, Chovalk, and Chūlak) is a village in Kalan Rural District, Zarneh District, Eyvan County, Ilam Province, Iran. At the 2006 census, its population was 47, in 10 families. The village is populated by Kurds.

References 

Populated places in Eyvan County
Kurdish settlements in Ilam Province